Portfield may refer to:

 Portfield, Dorset, a suburb of Christchurch, Dorset
 Portfield F.C., a defunct football club based in Chichester, West Sussex
 Portfield Hillfort, a building in Lancashire

See also 
 Porterfield (disambiguation)